Camilo Prieto Valderrama is a Colombian physician, climate science professor, and researcher. He is the founder of the NGO Movimiento Ambientalista Colombiano. He has received several awards for his work.

Biography 
Bachelor of Medicine from the Javeriana University, he studied a master's degree in Philosophy at the Javeriana University (2014), and a postgraduate degree in Human Rights at the Open University of Catalonia.

In 2013, he founded the Movimiento Ambientalista Colombiano, joining his two facets of doctor and activist.

Since then there have been many campaigns of assistance, awareness, and condemn in different points of the Colombian geography but mainly in San Andrés, Chocó, La Guajira and Putumayo.

As an environmental leader he has been a driving force behind pro-environment policies by participating in various political forums and negotiations: Insertion of Colombia in the Escazú Agreement for Latin America;  Energy Transition Table; and proposals to President Iván Duque after the social unrest of autumn 2019. In this case, Prieto denounced the lack of preventive policies on air and water pollution and the need to sign the Escazú Agreement. He is climate science professor at Pontifical Xavierian University and researcher at Colombian Geological Survey.

As a doctor, he has also been an opinion leader in the COVID-19 pandemic, and broadcasting through several educational videos the best ways to deal with the virus.

As a science communicator, he is the author of essays and articles, the blog and the internet video channel "El Planetario". He was a collaborator for 11 years of the TV program Muy Buenos Días, of the RCN Channel directed by Jota Mario Valencia  and is currently the host of Vida conciencia and for Canal Capital.

Books 
In his book "El perro a cuadros" (2013) he recounts his memories of childhood and youth when he began to be aware of the ecological crisis, and proposes environmental methodology through responsible consumption.

He wrote the essays "La economía de los nobles propósitos y el continente de la esperanza" and "La tonalidad de la muerte" after studying German idealism and Heidegger.  In the first of the books cited, he proposes a way to migrate towards a new economy. In 2021 he wrote "Nutrición Sostenible".

Campaigns 
 "Albendazole" (2016)
 "We are all Mocoa" (2017)
 "I am Guajira" (2016/2017)
 "We all planted"
 "Chocolectura"
 "El Chocó te necesita", "Guainía y Vaupés te necesitan"

Acknowledgements 
 Winner of the Titanes Caracol 2016 Award in the Environmental Sustainability category with the project "Environmental Classrooms" for the Wayuus people.
 Selection of Leaders of the Year 2018, Honorable Mention, Universidad Nacional Abierta y a Distancia (UNAD).
 Recognition as a "Forest Squire" (2019), Alliance Against Deforestation.
 Winner of Orden Cruz Esculapio (2022), Colegio Medico Colombiano.

References 

Colombian surgeons
Colombian activists
Science communicators
Year of birth missing (living people)
Living people
Pontifical Xavierian University alumni